In German military history, Bandenbekämpfung (German), also referred to as Nazi security warfare during World War II, refers to the concept and military doctrine of countering  resistance or insurrection in the rear area during wartime through extreme brutality. The doctrine provided a rationale for disregarding the established laws of war and for targeting of any number of groups, from armed guerrillas to the civilian population, as "bandits" or "members of gangs". As applied by the German Empire and later by Nazi Germany, it became instrumental in the mass crimes against humanity committed by the two regimes, including the Herero and Namaqua genocide and the Holocaust.

Background
According to historian and television documentary producer, Christopher Hale, there are indications that the term Bandenbekämpfung may go back as far as the Thirty Years' War. Under the German Empire established by Bismarck in 1871 after the Franco-Prussian War—formed as a union of twenty-five German states under the Hohenzollern king of Prussia—Prussian militarism flourished; martial traditions that included the military doctrine of Antoine-Henri Jomini's 1837 treatise, Summary of the Art of War, were put into effect. Some of the theories laid out by Jomini contained instructions for intense offensive operations and the necessity of securing one's "lines of operations". German military officers took this to mean as much attention should be given to logistical operations used to fight the war at the rear as those in the front, and certainly entailed security operations. Following Jomini's lead, Oberstleutnant Albrecht von Boguslawski published lectures entitled Der Kleine Krieg ("The Small War", a literal translation of guerrilla), which outlined in detail the tactical procedures related to partisan and anti-partisan warfare—likely deliberately written without clear distinctions between combatants and non-combatants. To what extent this contributed to the intensification of unrestrained warfare cannot be known, but Prussian officers like Alfred von Schlieffen encouraged their professional soldiers to embrace a dictum advocating that "for every problem, there was a military solution." Helmuth von Moltke, Chief of the Prussian General Staff, added hostage-taking as a means of deterrence to sabotage activities and the employment of collective measures against entire communities, which became the basis for German anti-partisan policies from 1870 and remained as such through 1945.

Franco-Prussian War
Prussian security operations during the Franco-Prussian War included the use of the Landwehr reservists, whose duties ranged from guarding railroad lines, to taking hostages, and carrying out reprisals to deter activities of the francs-tireurs. Bismarck wanted all francs-tireurs hanged or shot, and encouraged his military commanders to burn down villages that housed them. More formal structures like Chief of the Field Railway, a Military Railway Corps, District Commanders, Special Military Courts, intelligence units, and military police of varying duties and nomenclature were integrated into the Prussian system to bolster security operations all along the military's operational lines.

Boxer Rebellion and Herero Wars
Operationally, the first attempts to use tactics that would later develop into Bandenbekämpfung or be recognized as such were carried out in China in the wake of the Boxer Rebellion (1899–1901), after two German officers went missing, which was followed up with more than fifty operations by German troops, who set fire to a village and held prisoners. Shortly after these operations, the infantry was provided with a handbook for "operations against Chinese bandits" (Banden). The first full application of Bandenbekämpfung in practice, was the Herero and Namaqua genocide (1904–08), a campaign of racial extermination and collective punishment that the German Empire undertook in German South West Africa (modern-day Namibia) against the Herero and Nama people.

World War I

 	
During the First World War, the German Army ignored many of the commonly-understood European conventions of war when between August and October 1914, some 6,500 French and Belgian citizens were murdered. On some occasions, attacks against German infantry positions and patrols that may have actually been attributable to "friendly fire" were blamed on potential francs-tireurs, who were regarded as bandits and outside the rules of war, which elicited ruthless measures by German forces against the civilians and villages suspected of harboring them.  

Throughout the war, Germany's integrated intelligence, perimeter police, guard network and border control measures coalesced to define the German military's security operations. Along the Eastern Front sometime in August 1915, Field Marshal Erich von Falkenhayn established the Government General of Warsaw over the former Congress Poland under General Hans von Beseler and created an infrastructure to support ongoing military operations, which included guards posts, patrols and a security network. Maintaining security meant dealing with Russian prisoners, many of whom tried to sabotage German plans and kill German soldiers, so harsh pacification measures and terror actions were carried out, including brutal reprisals against civilians, otherwise known as bandits. Before long, similar practices were instituted throughout the Eastern and Western areas of German occupied territory.

World War II 

DUring World War II, the German Army policy for deterring partisan or "bandit" activities against its forces was to strike "such terror into the population that it loses all will to resist." Even before the Nazi campaign in the East began, Hitler had already absolved his soldiers and police from any responsibility for brutality against civilians, expecting them to kill anyone that even "looked askance" at the German forces. Much of the partisan warfare became an exercise of anti-Semitism, as military commanders like General Bechtolsheim exclaimed that whenever an act of sabotage was committed and one killed the Jews from that village, then "one can be certain that one has destroyed the perpetrators, or at least those who stood behind them." 

Following the Nazi invasion of Poland in 1939 and its reorganization, security and policing merged with the establishment of Bandenbekämpfung operations. Aside from the groups assigned to fight partisans, additional manpower was provided by the Gestapo, the Kripo (criminal police), the SD, and the Waffen-SS. There were a number of SS-led actions implemented against so–called "partisans" in Lemberg, Warsaw, Lublin, Kovel, and other places across Poland.    

When the Wehrmacht entered Serbia in 1941, they carried out mass reprisals against alleged "partisans" by executing Jews there. The commander responsible for combating partisan warfare in 1941, General Franz Böhme, reiterated to the German forces, "that rivers of German blood" had been spilled in Serbia during the First World War and the Wehrmacht should consider any acts of violence there as "avenging these deaths."

Before invading the Soviet Union for Operation Barbarossa, Reichsführer-SS Heinrich Himmler, and Chief of the SD Reinhard Heydrich, as well as SS General Heinrich Müller briefed the Einsatzgruppen leaders of their responsibility to secure the rear areas—using the euphemism "special treatment"—against potential enemies; this included partisans and anyone deemed a threat by the Nazi functionaries. When Heydrich repeated this directive as an operational order (Einsatzbefehl), he stressed that this also meant functionaries of the Comintern, Jews, and anyone of position in the Communist party. This was part of the SS contribution to prevent crime in the newly conquered territories, to maintain order, and to ensure the efficient establishment of miniature Nazi governments, constituted by mobile versions of the Reich Security Main Office.

Starting the same day the Nazis invaded the Soviet Union (22 June 1941), the 12th Infantry Division command  issued orders that guerilla warfare combatants were not to be quartered as POWs but were to be "sentenced on the spot by an officer," meaning they were to be summarily shot. On 31 July 1941, the 16th Army command were informed that any 'Partisan-Battalions' formed behind the front that were not properly uniformed and without appropriate means of identification, "were to be treated as guerrillas, whether they were soldiers or not." Any civilians who provided any assistance whatsoever were to be treated likewise, which historian Omer Bartov claims "always meant one thing only: death by shooting or hanging." Members of the 18th Panzer Division were instructed likewise on 4 August 1941. 

From September 1941 onwards through the course of World War II, the term Bandenbekämpfung supplanted Partisanenkämpfung (anti-partisan warfare) to become the guiding principle of Nazi Germany's security warfare and occupational policies; largely as a result of Himmler's insistence that for psychological reasons, bandit was somehow preferable. Himmler charged the 'Prinz Eugen' Division to expressly deal with "partisan revolts." Units like the SS Galizien—who were likewise tasked to deal with partisans—included foreign recruits overseen by experienced German "bandit" fighters well-versed in the "mass murder of unarmed civilians." In keeping with these extreme measures, the OKW issued orders on 13 September 1941, that "Russian soldiers who had been overrun by the German forces and had then reorganised behind the front were to be treated as partisans - that is, to be shot. It was left to the commanders on the spot to decide who belonged to this category." 

On 23 October 1942, Himmler named SS General Erich von dem Bach-Zelewski the "Commissioner for Anti-Bandit Warfare." Then Himmler transferred SS General Curt von Gottberg to Byelorussia to ensure that the Bandenbekämpfung operations were conducted on a permanent basis, a task which Gottberg carried out with fanatical ruthlessness, declaring the entire population bandits, Jews, Gypsies, spies, or bandit sympathizers. During Gottberg's first major operations, Operations Nürnberg and Hamburg, conducted between November through December 1942, he reported 5,000 murdered Jews, another 5,000 bandits or suspects eliminated, and 30 villages burned down.

Also in October 1942—just a couple months prior to Gottberg's exploits—Reichsmarschall Hermann Göring had ordered "anti-bandit warfare" in Army Group Rear Area Center, which was shortly followed by an OKH Directive on 11 November 1942 for "anti-bandit warfare in the East" that announced sentimental considerations as "irresponsible" and instructed the men to shoot or preferably hang bandits, including women. Misgivings from commanders within Army Group Rear that such operations were counterproductive and in poor taste, since women and children were also being murdered, went ignored or resisted from Bach-Zelewski, who frequently "cited the special powers of the Reichsführer." During late November 1942, forty-one "Polish-Jewish bandits" were killed in the forest area of Lubionia, which included "reprisals" against villages in the area. Another action undertaken under the auspices of anti-bandit operations occurred near Lublin in early November 1943; named Aktion Erntefest (Action Harvest Festival), SS-Police and Waffen-SS units, accompanied by members of the Lublin police, rounded up and killed 42,000 Jews.    

Over time, the Wehrmacht acculturated to the large scale anti-bandit operations, as they too came to see the entire population as criminal and complicit in any operation against German troops. Many German army commanders were unbothered by the fact that these operations fell under the jurisdiction of the SS.  Historians Ben Shepherd and Juliette Pattinson note:
As the war dragged on, the occupation’s mounting economic rapacity engendered a vicious cycle of further resistance, further German brutality in response, and the erosion of order and stability across occupied Europe. Here, the issue of how occupation strategy shaped the partisan war connects with...how the nature and course of the partisan war was affected by the relationship between the occupied rear and the front line. Indeed, in eastern Europe during World War II, most directly in the Soviet Union, keeping occupied territory pacified was crucial to supplying not just the German front line, but also the German domestic population.

Historian Jeff Rutherford claims that "Whilst the Wehrmacht focused on the Red Army, SD and other SS formations would combat any resistance movements in the rear. In effect, the German Army willingly ensnared itself in the Nazi machinery of annihilation and extermination by working with the SS to systematically suppress partisan movements and other forms of perceived resistance." To this end, Einsatzgruppen, Order Police, SS-Sonderkommandos and army forces—for the most part—worked cooperatively to combat partisans ("bandits"), not only acting as judge, jury, and executioners in the field, but also in plundering "bandit areas"; they laid these areas to waste, seized crops and livestock, enslaved the local population or murdered them. Anti-bandit operations were characterized by "special cruelty."  For instance, Soviet Jews were murdered outright under the pretext that they were partisans per Hitler's orders. Historian Timothy Snyder asserts that by the second half of 1942, "German anti-partisan operations were all but indistinguishable from the mass murder of the Jews." Other historians have made similar observations. Omer Bartov argued that under the auspices of destroying their "so-called political and biological enemies," often described as  "bandits" or "partisans," the Nazis made no effort "to distinguish between real guerrillas, political suspects, and Jews." 

According to historian Erich Haberer, the Nazi's murderous policies toward the Jews provided the victims little choice; driven to "coalesce into small groups to survive in forested areas from where they emerged periodically to forage food in nearby fields and villages, the Germans created their own partisan problem, which, by its very nature, was perceived as banditry." Typically these "heroic and futile acts of resistance" against the Nazi occupiers were often in vain considering the "insurmountable odds" of success, although the Jews in the Warsaw Ghetto managed to resists for upwards of four months, which historian Patrick Henry notes, was "longer than some national armies" managed. Such activity "worked powerfully against the anti-Semitic stereotype...that Jews would not fight." Correspondingly, there are estimates that 30,000 Jews joined partisan units in Belorussia and the western Ukraine alone, while other Jewish partisan groups joined fighters from Bulgaria, Greece, and Yugoslavia, where they assisted in derailing trains, destroying bridges, and carrying out sabotage acts that contributed to the deaths of thousands of German soldiers.

Surging operations from better equipped partisans against Army Group Center during 1943 intensified to the degree that the 221st Security Division's did not just eliminate "bandits" but laid entire regions where they operated to waste. The scale of this effort must be taken into consideration, as historian Michael Burleigh reports that anti-partisan operations had a significant impact on German operations in the East; namely, since they caused "widespread economic disruption, tied down manpower which could have been deployed elsewhere, and by instilling fear and provoking extreme countermeasures, drove a wedge between occupiers and occupied." 

Following the Warsaw Uprising of August 1944, the Nazis intensified their anti-partisan operations in Poland, during which the German forces employed their version of anti-partisan tactics by shooting upwards of 120,000 civilians in Warsaw. Ideologically speaking, since partisans represented an immediate existential threat, in that, they were equated with Jews or people under their influence, the systematic murder of anyone associated with them was an expression of the regime's racial anti-Semitism and was viewed by members of the Wehrmacht as a "necessity of war." Much of this Nazi mindset in killing partisan "enemies" was not just an immediate expediency but was preemptive warfare against "future" enemies.    

Across western and southern Europe, the implementation of anti-bandit operations was uneven, owing to a constantly evolving set of rules of engagement, command and control disputes at the local level, and the complexity of regional politics with regard to the regime's goals in each respective nation.    

Throughout the war in Europe, and especially during the German-Soviet War, 1941–45, these doctrines amalgamated with the Nazi regime's genocidal plans for the racial reshaping of the Eastern Europe to secure "living space" (Lebensraum) for Germany. In the first eleven months of the war against the Soviet Union, the German forces liquidated in excess of 80,000 alleged partisans. Implemented by units of the SS, Wehrmacht and Order Police, Bandenbekämpfung as applied by the Nazi regime and directed by the SS across occupied Europe led to mass crimes against humanity and was an instrumental part of the Holocaust.

Führer Directive 46

In July 1942, Himmler was appointed to lead the security initiatives in rear areas. One of his first actions in this role was the prohibition of the use of "partisan" to describe counter-insurgents. Bandits (Banden) was the term chosen to be used by German forces. Hitler insisted that Himmler was "solely responsible" for combating bandits except in districts under military administration; such districts were under the authority of the Wehrmacht. The organisational changes, putting experienced SS killers in charge, and language that criminalised resistance, whether real or imagined,  the transformation of security warfare into massacres.

The radicalisation of "anti-bandit" warfare saw further impetus in the Führer Directive 46 of 18 August 1942, where security warfare's aim was defined as "complete extermination". The directive called on the security forces to act with "utter brutality", while providing immunity from prosecution for any acts committed during "bandit-fighting" operations.

The directive designated the SS as the organisation responsible for rear-area warfare in areas under civilian administration. In areas under military jurisdiction (the Army Group Rear Areas), the Army High Command had the overall responsibility. The directive declared the entire population of "bandit" (i.e. partisan-controlled) territories as enemy combatants. In practice, this meant that the aims of security warfare was not pacification, but complete destruction and depopulation of "bandit" and "bandit-threatened" territories, turning them into "dead zones" (Tote Zonen).

See also
 Axis anti-partisan operations in World War II
 Hitler's Bandit Hunters: The SS and the Nazi Occupation of Europe
 Marching into Darkness: The Wehrmacht and the Holocaust in Belarus
 Myth of the clean Wehrmacht
 Waffen-SS in popular culture

References

Notes

Citations

Bibliography

 
 
 
 
 
 
 
 
 
 
 
 
 
 
 
 
 
 
 
 
 
 
 
 
 
 
 

 
Military doctrines
The Holocaust
Holocaust terminology
Nazi SS
Racially motivated violence
German words and phrases
Euphemisms